Tivadar Tulassay (born 18 January 1949) is a Hungarian pediatrician, who served as Rector of the Semmelweis University between 2003 and 2012. He is a member of the Hungarian Academy of Sciences (2007) and the European Academy of Sciences and Arts since 2012. He also member of the conservative Batthyány Society of Professors.

Main publications
Koraszülöttek patológiás veseműködése (PhD thesis, 1983)
Atrial Natriuretic Peptide in Plasma of Volume-Overloaded Children with Chronic Renal Failure (co-author, 1985)
Hormonal Regulation of Water Metabolism in Children with Nephrotic Syndrome (co-author, 1987)
A pitvari nátriuretikus peptid és egyéb vazoaktív hormonok szabályozó szerepe a folyadék- és elektrolitháztartásban (academic doctoral thesis, 1989)
Renal Vascular Disease in the Newborn (co-author, 1998)
Renal Insufficiency and Acute Renal Failure (co-author, 1998)
Magas vérnyomás csecsemő és gyermekkorban (1999)
Humán gyomornyálkahártya savtermelő képességének közvetlem meghatározása gasztroszkópia során vett biopsziás mintákból (co-author, 2000)
Kis születési súlyú fiatal felnőttek mellékvesehormonjainak vizsgálata és ezek összefüggése a szénhidrát-anyagcsere és a cardiovascularis rendszer egyes paramétereivel (co-author, 2000)
Variance of ACE and ATI Receptor Gene does not Influence the Rist Neonatal Acute Renal Failure (co-author, 2001)
Gender-specific association of vitamin D receptor polymorphism combinations with type 1 diabetes mellitus (co-author, 2002)
Sex differences in the alterations of Na+,K+-ATPase following ischaemia-reperfusion injury in the rat kidney (co-author, 2004)
Increased mucosal expression of Toll-like receptor (TLR)2 and TLR4 in coeliac disease (co-author, 2007)

References

External links
A Magyar Tudományos Akadémia tagjai 1825–2002 III. (R–ZS). ed. Ferenc Glatz. Budapest: MTA Társadalomkutató Központ. 2003. pp. 1328–1329.
MTI Ki Kicsoda 2009, Magyar Távirati Iroda Zrt., Budapest, 2008, p. 1131.
Profile with list of publications on the website of the Hungarian Academy of Sciences
Short bio on the website of the Semmelweis University
Biography on the website of the project "Mindentudás Egyeteme"

1949 births
Living people
Hungarian pediatricians
Academic staff of Semmelweis University
Members of the Hungarian Academy of Sciences
People from Galanta
Members of the European Academy of Sciences and Arts